The 2020–21 Liga Leumit will be the 22nd season as second tier since its re-alignment in 1999 and the 79th season of second-tier football in Israel.

A total of sixteen teams will be contesting in the league, including twelve sides from the 2019–20 season, the two promoted teams from 2019–20 Liga Alef and the two relegated teams from 2019–20 Israeli Premier League.

Changes from 2019–20 season

Team changes

The following teams have changed division since the 2019–20 season.

To Liga Leumit

Promoted from Liga Alef

 
 Hapoel Iksal (North Division)

Relegated from Premier League

 Sektzia Ness Ziona
 Hapoel Ra'anana

From Liga Leumit

Promoted to Premier League
 Maccabi Petah Tikva
 Bnei Sakhnin

Relegated to Liga Alef
 Hapoel Bnei Lod
 Hapoel Ashkelon

Overview

Stadia and locations

The club is playing their home games at a neutral venue because their own ground does not meet league requirements.

Regular season

Results

Results by round
The table lists the results of teams in each round.

Position by round

Promotion playoffs

Results by round
The table lists the results of teams in each round.

Relegation playoffs

Results by round
The table lists the results of teams in each round.

Promotion/relegation playoff

The 14th-placed team faced 2020–21 Liga Alef promotion play-offs winner in a one game.

See also
 2020–21 Toto Cup Leumit

References

2020–21 in Israeli football leagues
Liga Leumit seasons
Isr